Spencer Township is one of the eleven townships of Lucas County, Ohio, United States. The 2010 census found 1,882 people in the township.

Geography
Located in the western part of the county, it borders the following townships:
Richfield Township - north
Sylvania Township - northeast
Springfield Township - east
Monclova Township - southeast
Swanton Township - south
Harding Township - southwest
Fulton Township, Fulton County - west
Amboy Township, Fulton County - northwest corner

No municipalities are located in Spencer Township, although the unincorporated community of Frankfort lies in the township's west.

Name
Statewide, other Spencer Townships are located in Allen, Guernsey, and Medina counties and formerly in Hamilton County.

History
Spencer Township was established in 1845.

Government
The township is governed by a three-member board of trustees, who are elected in November of odd-numbered years to a four-year term beginning on the following January 1. Two are elected in the year after the presidential election and one is elected in the year before it. There is also an elected township fiscal officer, who serves a four-year term beginning on April 1 of the year after the election, which is held in November of the year before the presidential election. Vacancies in the fiscal officership or on the board of trustees are filled by the remaining trustees.

References

External links

County website
Township fire department

Townships in Lucas County, Ohio
Townships in Ohio